This is an incomplete list of current and former members of the Cosmos Club in Washington, D.C.

References 

Clubs and societies in Washington, D.C.
Washington, D.C.-related lists